ABC Southern Queensland is an ABC Local Radio station based in Toowoomba broadcasting to the Darling Downs region of Queensland, Australia.  This includes the towns of Warwick, Dalby, Kingaroy and Goondiwindi.

History
The station began broadcasting as 4QS in 1939.  As well as a number of low power FM transmitters, the station broadcasts through the following main FM and AM transmitters:

4QS 747 AM
4QS/T 104.9 FM

See also
 List of radio stations in Australia

References

 

Southern Queensland
Radio stations in Queensland